Eckelson is an unincorporated community in Barnes County, North Dakota, United States. Eckelson is west of Sanborn and north of Interstate 94, which has an exit serving Eckelson.

References

Unincorporated communities in Barnes County, North Dakota
Unincorporated communities in North Dakota